Ralph Frederick Winter (born April 24, 1952) is an American film producer who has helped to produce blockbuster movies such as the X-Men, Fantastic Four and Star Trek series as well as I, Robot and Planet of the Apes. His films have grossed collectively over $2 billion (USD).

Winter is a member of the Directors Guild of America and the Academy of Motion Picture Arts and Sciences.

He has helped along such film schools as the Veracity Project, Biola University, and lectured at Regent College, Vancouver.

Early life and career
Winter was born in Glendale, California, the son of Effie Audrey (Crawford) and Charles Frederick Winter. He attended the University of California, Berkeley, where he studied History. His first experience in production was producing training videos for Broadway Department Stores. In 1978, Winter started working in the film business for Paramount Pictures television, where he worked on Happy Days, Laverne & Shirley, and Mork and Mindy. Following his experiences in television he started working alongside Harve Bennett on the Star Trek films. He was an associate producer on Star Trek III: The Search for Spock, executive producer on Star Trek IV: The Voyage Home and Star Trek V: The Final Frontier, and producer on Star Trek VI: The Undiscovered Country.

Christian films produced
Winter is also active in producing Christian movies, such as Three, based on Ted Dekker's book, and Hangman's Curse and The Visitation, both of which were novel-to-movie creations written by Christian author Frank Peretti. His latest Christian film House was released in March 2009.

Other work
In 2010, Winter partnered with producer Terry Botwick to form the production company, 1019 Entertainment. The company has produced the films, Cool It and Captive.

Personal life
Winter is a Christian and his faith influenced him to co-operate on a movie based on the Left Behind series of books, although he left that project before it was completed.

Filmography 
1984 Star Trek III: The Search for Spock
1986 Star Trek IV: The Voyage Home
1989 Star Trek V: The Final Frontier
1991 Star Trek VI: The Undiscovered Country
1991 Plymouth
1993 Hocus Pocus
1994 The Puppet Masters
1995 Hackers
1996 High Incident
1998 Mighty Joe Young
1999 Inspector Gadget
2000 X-Men
2000 Left Behind: The Movie
2001 Planet of the Apes
2003 Blizzard
2003 X2
2005 Fantastic Four
2006 X-Men: The Last Stand
2006 The Visitation
2007 Fantastic Four: Rise of the Silver Surfer
2007 Three
2009 X-Men Origins: Wolverine
2010 In My Sleep
2010 Cool It
2015 Captive
2017 The Promise
2022 What Remains
2023 Reagan

References

External links

1952 births
Film producers from California
American Presbyterians
Living people
People from Glendale, California
UC Berkeley College of Letters and Science alumni